Maurice A. Hanline (June 6, 1895 - September 1964) was an American playwright, poet, novelist and screenwriter. He worked as a screenwriter for Metro-Goldwyn-Mayer for more than three decades.

Early life
Hanline was born in 1895 in Baltimore, Maryland. He graduated from Baltimore City College.

Career
Hanline staged his own play, The Woman of Samaria, in Baltimore in 1921. He worked in publishing in New York City for Horace Liveright in the 1920s, and he became a published poet. In 1930, he began working as a screenwriter for Metro-Goldwyn-Mayer in Los Angeles. He published his first novel, Years of Indiscretion in 1935. He worked for MGM until his death.

Movies he worked on include Lottery Lover (1935), Four Wives (1939), and Steel Against the Sky (1941).

Personal life and death
Hanline married Patricia O'Brien. He died in 1964, at age 69.

References

External links
Maurice Hanline on IMDb

1895 births
1964 deaths
People from Baltimore
Baltimore City College alumni
American male dramatists and playwrights
20th-century American dramatists and playwrights
American male poets
20th-century American poets
American male novelists
20th-century American novelists
American male screenwriters
20th-century American male writers
20th-century American screenwriters